The Global Entrepreneur Programme, sometimes referred to as GEP, is a venture capital programme aimed at creating global companies from start-ups, using the United Kingdom as a strategic headquarters and base for international expansion. The GEP was set up in 2003 by UK Trade & Investment.

External links
 

Entrepreneurship organizations